This is a list of 213 species in Leptogenys, a genus of ants in the family Formicidae.

Leptogenys species

 Leptogenys acutangula Emery, 1914 i c g
 Leptogenys acutirostris Santschi, 1912 i c g
 Leptogenys adlerzi Forel, 1900 i c g
 Leptogenys alluaudi Emery, 1895 i c g
 Leptogenys amazonica Borgmeier, 1930 i c g
 Leptogenys ambigua Santschi, 1931 i c g
 Leptogenys amon Bolton, 1975 i c g
 Leptogenys anacleti Borgmeier, 1930 i c g
 Leptogenys angusta (Forel, 1892) i c g
 Leptogenys angustinoda Clark, 1934 i c g
 Leptogenys anitae Forel, 1915 i c g
 Leptogenys ankhesa Bolton, 1975 i c g
 Leptogenys antillana Wheeler, 1914 i c g
 Leptogenys antongilensis Emery, 1899 i c g
 Leptogenys arcirostris Santschi, 1926 i c g
 Leptogenys arcuata Roger, 1861 i c g
 Leptogenys arnoldi Forel, 1913 i c g
 Leptogenys aspera (Andre, 1889) i c g
 Leptogenys assamensis Forel, 1900 i c g
 Leptogenys attenuata (Smith, 1858) i c
 Leptogenys australis (Emery, 1888) i c g
 Leptogenys bellii Emery, 1901 i c g
 Leptogenys bidentata Forel, 1900 i c g
 Leptogenys binghamii Forel, 1900 i c g
 Leptogenys birmana Forel, 1900 i c g
 Leptogenys bituberculata Emery, 1901 i c g
 Leptogenys bohlsi Emery, 1896 i c g
 Leptogenys borneensis Wheeler, 1919 i c g
 Leptogenys breviceps Viehmeyer, 1914 i c g
 Leptogenys brevinodis  g
 Leptogenys bubastis Bolton, 1975 i c g
 Leptogenys buyssoni Forel, 1907 i c g
 Leptogenys caeciliae Viehmeyer, 1912 i c g
 Leptogenys camerunensis Stitz, 1910 i c g
 Leptogenys carinata Donisthorpe, 1943 i c g
 Leptogenys castanea (Mayr, 1862) i c g
 Leptogenys centralis Wheeler, 1915 i c g
 Leptogenys chalybaea (Emery, 1887) i c g
 Leptogenys chelifera (Santschi, 1928) i c g
 Leptogenys chinensis (Mayr, 1870) i c g
 Leptogenys clarki Wheeler, 1933 i c g
 Leptogenys coerulescens Emery, 1895 i c g
 Leptogenys comajojo Rakotonirina & Fisher, 2014 g
 Leptogenys comorensis  g
 Leptogenys confucii Forel, 1912 i c g
 Leptogenys conigera (Mayr, 1876) i c g
 Leptogenys conradti Forel, 1913 i c g
 Leptogenys consanguinea Wheeler, 1909 i c g
 Leptogenys crassicornis Emery, 1895 i c g
 Leptogenys crassinoda Arnold, 1926 i c g
 Leptogenys cribrata  g
 Leptogenys crudelis (Smith, 1858) i c g
 Leptogenys crustosa Santschi, 1914 i c g
 Leptogenys cryptica Bolton, 1975 i c g
 Leptogenys dalyi Forel, 1900 i c g
 Leptogenys darlingtoni Wheeler, 1933 i c g
 Leptogenys dasygyna Wheeler, 1923 i c g
 Leptogenys davydovi Karavaiev, 1935 i c g
 Leptogenys dentilobis Forel, 1900 i c g
 Leptogenys diatra Bolton, 1975 i c g
 Leptogenys diminuta (Smith, 1857) i c g
 Leptogenys donisthorpei Mann, 1922 i c g
 Leptogenys drepanon Wilson, 1958 i c g
 Leptogenys ebenina Forel, 1915 i c g
 Leptogenys elegans Bolton, 1975 i c g
 Leptogenys elongata (Buckley, 1866) i c g b
 Leptogenys emeryi Forel, 1901 i c g
 Leptogenys emiliae Forel, 1902 i c g
 Leptogenys ergatogyna Wheeler, 1922 i c g
 Leptogenys erythraea Emery, 1902 i c g
 Leptogenys excellens Bolton, 1975 i c g
 Leptogenys excisa (Mayr, 1876) i c g
 Leptogenys exigua (Crawley, 1921) i c g
 Leptogenys exudans (Walker, 1859) i c g
 Leptogenys falcigera Roger, 1861 i c g
 Leptogenys fallax (Mayr, 1876) i c
 Leptogenys famelica Emery, 1896 i c g
 Leptogenys ferrarii Forel, 1913 i c g
 Leptogenys foreli Mann, 1919 i c g
 Leptogenys fortior Forel, 1900 i c g
 Leptogenys foveopunctata Mann, 1921 i c g
 Leptogenys fugax Mann, 1921 i c g
 Leptogenys furtiva Arnold, 1926 i c g
 Leptogenys gagates Mann, 1922 i c g
 Leptogenys gaigei Wheeler, 1923 i c g
 Leptogenys gracilis Emery, 1899 i c g
 Leptogenys grandidieri Forel, 1910 i c g
 Leptogenys guianensis Wheeler, 1923 i c g
 Leptogenys guineensis Santschi, 1914 i c g
 Leptogenys hackeri Clark, 1934 i c g
 Leptogenys hanseni Borgmeier, 1930 i c g
 Leptogenys harmsi Donisthorpe, 1935 i c g
 Leptogenys havilandi Forel, 1901 i c g
 Leptogenys hebrideana Wilson, 1958 i c g
 Leptogenys hemioptica Forel, 1901 i c g
 Leptogenys hodgsoni Forel, 1900 i c g
 Leptogenys honduriana Mann, 1922 i c g
 Leptogenys honoria Bolton, 1975 i c g
 Leptogenys humiliata Mann, 1921 i c g
 Leptogenys hysterica Forel, 1900 i c g
 Leptogenys iheringi Forel, 1911 i c g
 Leptogenys imperatrix Mann, 1922 i c g
 Leptogenys incisa Forel, 1891 i c g
 Leptogenys indigatrix Wilson, 1958 i c g
 Leptogenys ingens Mayr, 1866 i c g
 Leptogenys intermedia Emery, 1902 i c g
 Leptogenys intricata Viehmeyer, 1924 i c g
 Leptogenys iridescens (Smith, 1857) i c g
 Leptogenys iridipennis (Smith, 1858) i c
 Leptogenys jeanneli Santschi, 1914 i c g
 Leptogenys karawaiewi Santschi, 1928 i c g
 Leptogenys keysseri Viehmeyer, 1914 i c g
 Leptogenys khaura Bolton, 1975 i c g
 Leptogenys kitteli (Mayr, 1870) i c g
 Leptogenys kraepelini Forel, 1905 i c g
 Leptogenys langi Wheeler, 1923 i c g
 Leptogenys leiothorax Prins, 1965 i c g
 Leptogenys letilae Mann, 1921 i c g
 Leptogenys linearis (Smith, 1858) i c g
 Leptogenys longensis Forel, 1915 i c g
 Leptogenys longiceps Santschi, 1914 i c g
 Leptogenys longiscapa Donisthorpe, 1943 i c g
 Leptogenys lucidula Emery, 1895 i c g
 Leptogenys luederwaldti Forel, 1913 i c g
 Leptogenys mactans Bolton, 1975 i c g
 Leptogenys magna Forel, 1900 i c g
 Leptogenys manni Wheeler, 1923 i c g b
 Leptogenys mastax Bolton, 1975 i c g
 Leptogenys maxillosa (Smith, 1858) i c g
 Leptogenys mayotte Rakotonirina & Fisher, 2014 g
 Leptogenys melzeri Borgmeier, 1930 i c g
 Leptogenys meritans (Walker, 1859) i c g
 Leptogenys mexicana (Mayr, 1870) i c g
 Leptogenys microps Bolton, 1975 i c g
 Leptogenys minchinii Forel, 1900 i c g
 Leptogenys mjobergi Forel, 1915 i c g
 Leptogenys modiglianii Emery, 1900 i c g
 Leptogenys moelleri (Bingham, 1903) i c
 Leptogenys mucronata Forel, 1893 i c g
 Leptogenys mutabilis (Smith, 1861) i c g
 Leptogenys myops (Emery, 1887) i c g
 Leptogenys navua Mann, 1921 i c g
 Leptogenys nebra Bolton, 1975 i c g
 Leptogenys neutralis Forel, 1907 i c g
 Leptogenys nitens Donisthorpe, 1943 i c g
 Leptogenys nitida  g
 Leptogenys nuserra Bolton, 1975 i c g
 Leptogenys occidentalis Bernard, 1953 i c g
 Leptogenys optica Viehmeyer, 1914 i c g
 Leptogenys oresbia Wilson, 1958 i c g
 Leptogenys oswaldi (Forel, 1891) i c
 Leptogenys panops Lattke, 2011 g
 Leptogenys papuana Emery, 1897 i c g
 Leptogenys parvula Emery, 1900 i c g
 Leptogenys pavesii Emery, 1892 i c g
 Leptogenys peninsularis Mann, 1926 i c g
 Leptogenys peringueyi Forel, 1913 i c g
 Leptogenys peuqueti (Andre, 1887) i c g
 Leptogenys piroskae Forel, 1910 i c g
 Leptogenys podenzanai (Emery, 1895) i c g
 Leptogenys pompiloides (Smith, 1857) i c g
 Leptogenys princeps Bolton, 1975 i c g
 Leptogenys processionalis (Jerdon, 1851) i c g
 Leptogenys pruinosa Forel, 1900 i c g
 Leptogenys pubiceps Emery, 1890 i c g
 Leptogenys punctata Emery, 1914 i c g
 Leptogenys punctaticeps Emery, 1890 i c g
 Leptogenys punctiventris (Mayr, 1879) i c g
 Leptogenys purpurea (Emery, 1887) i c g
 Leptogenys pusilla (Emery, 1890) i c g
 Leptogenys quiriguana Wheeler, 1923 i c g
 Leptogenys ravida Bolton, 1975 i c g
 Leptogenys regis Bolton, 1975 i c g
 Leptogenys ridens Forel, 1910 i c g
 Leptogenys ritae Forel, 1899 i c g
 Leptogenys roberti Forel, 1900 i c g
 Leptogenys rouxi (Emery, 1914) i c g
 Leptogenys rufa Mann, 1922 i c g
 Leptogenys rugosopunctata Karavaiev, 1925 i c g
 Leptogenys sagaris Wilson, 1958 i c g
 Leptogenys saussurei (Forel, 1891) i c g
 Leptogenys schwabi Forel, 1913 i c g
 Leptogenys sjostedti Forel, 1915 i c g
 Leptogenys spandax Bolton, 1975 i c g
 Leptogenys stenocheilos (Jerdon, 1851) i c g
 Leptogenys sterops Bolton, 1975 i c g
 Leptogenys strator Bolton, 1975 i c g
 Leptogenys striatidens Bolton, 1975 i c g
 Leptogenys stuhlmanni Mayr, 1893 i c g
 Leptogenys stygia Bolton, 1975 i c g
 Leptogenys sublaevis  g
 Leptogenys sulcinoda (Andre, 1892) i c g
 Leptogenys terroni Bolton, 1975 i c g
 Leptogenys testacea (Donisthorpe, 1948) i c
 Leptogenys titan Bolton, 1975 i c g
 Leptogenys tricosa Taylor, 1969 i c g
 Leptogenys triloba Emery, 1901 i c g
 Leptogenys trilobata Santschi, 1924 i c g
 Leptogenys truncata Mann, 1919 i c g
 Leptogenys truncatirostris Forel, 1897 i c g
 Leptogenys turneri Forel, 1900 i c g
 Leptogenys unistimulosa Roger, 1863 i c g
 Leptogenys varicosa Stitz, 1925 i c g
 Leptogenys venatrix Forel, 1899 i c g
 Leptogenys vindicis Bolton, 1975 i c g
 Leptogenys violacea Donisthorpe, 1942 i c g
 Leptogenys vitiensis Mann, 1921 i c g
 Leptogenys voeltzkowi Forel, 1897 i c g
 Leptogenys vogeli Borgmeier, 1933 i c g
 Leptogenys watsoni Forel, 1900 i c g
 Leptogenys wheeleri Forel, 1901 i c g
 Leptogenys yerburyi Forel, 1900 i c g
 Leptogenys zapyxis Bolton, 1975 i c g

Data sources: i = ITIS, c = Catalogue of Life, g = GBIF, b = Bugguide.net

References

Leptogenys